Yukimi Eleanora Nagano (born 31 January 1982) is a Swedish singer and songwriter. She is the vocalist for the Swedish electronic group Little Dragon.

Career

Early career

Nagano first made a record at the age of 18 with Andreas Saag (Swell Session). She then worked with Swedish nu jazz duo Koop on the songs "Summer Sun" and "Bright Nights" (both from 2001's Waltz for Koop) and joined the duo on tour, which she says "opened a lot of doors for me both life and collaboration wise". She collaborated with Koop again on "Come to Me", "I See a Different You", and "Whenever There Is You" for the 2006 release Koop Islands. Nagano also contributed significant vocal work to the 2004 album Moving On by Hird, including the song "Keep You Kimi" and the title track "Moving On".

Little Dragon

Nagano is the vocalist of Gothenburg-based electronic band Little Dragon, which she established with her close high school friends Erik Bodin (drums) and Fredrik Wallin (bass) in 1996 while they were in high school. Håkan Wirenstrand (keyboards) joined the group later. Nagano and her bandmates each applied to music college but were denied entrance, and instead continued to make music together while working side jobs. In 2007, Little Dragon released their first single, "Twice", which led to the group being signed to the record label Peacefrog Records. The band released their self-titled debut album on September 3, 2007, to favorable reception. This was followed by Machine Dreams in 2009.

Little Dragon was featured in Gorillaz's 2010 album Plastic Beach on the songs "Empire Ants" and "To Binge", both of which Nagano co-wrote, and she performed in the "Escape to Plastic Beach Tour" the same year.

Little Dragon's third studio album, Ritual Union, was released in July 2011 and the band went on tour in North America, Europe, and Australia.
The band's fourth studio album, Nabuma Rubberband, was released in May 2014 in the United Kingdom via Because Music and in the United States via Loma Vista Recordings. It received a nomination for Best Dance/Electronic Album at the 57th Annual Grammy Awards. The album was supported by tours in Europe and North America.

In 2015, Nagano was featured, along with Little Dragon, on electronic music duo ODESZA's 2015 single "Light". Also in 2015, Nagano and Little Dragon were featured on Mac Miller's GO:OD AM album on the last track titled "The Festival".

In 2016, Little Dragon collaborated with De La Soul on the track "Drawn" and a music video for the song was released in 2017. Season High, Little Dragon's fifth studio album, was also released in 2017.

Other work

She and Erik Bodin have played live with fellow Gothenburg artist, José González.
 
In 2011, Nagano was featured on SBTRKT's eponymous debut album with her vocals on the song "Wildfire".
She is also featured on Raphael Saadiq's 2011 album Stone Rollin' on the song "Just Don't".

She also provided vocals for "Scale It Back" on DJ Shadow's 2011 album The Less You Know, the Better and for "Descending", "Higher Res", and "Thom Pettie" from Big Boi's 2012 album Vicious Lies and Dangerous Rumors. Nagano additionally co-wrote "Mama Told Me" and sang on the song's original version.

Personal life
Nagano was born and raised in Gothenburg, Sweden, to Japanese father Yusuke Nagano and Swedish-American mother Joanne Brown. She has a son, Jaxon, who was born in 2016. Nagano's sister is the musician Sandra Sumie Nagano, whose eponymous album was released by Bella Union in December 2013.

References

External links
  – official site
 

1982 births
English-language singers from Sweden
Living people
People from Gothenburg
Swedish electronic musicians
Swedish women singer-songwriters
Swedish singer-songwriters
Swedish people of American descent
Swedish people of Japanese descent
Swedish women in electronic music
21st-century Swedish singers
21st-century Swedish women singers
Chill-out musicians